A post box topper is, typically, a woven hat or bonnet for a post box designed as a tribute or to commemorate special events. In the United Kingdom they have been used to pay tribute to National Health Service workers during the coronavirus pandemic, for Queen Elizabeth II's platinum jubilee, and in September 2022 as a tribute to the Queen on her death.

In June 2021, the Warrington Guardian reported that "yarn bombers" had placed numerous toppers or bonnets on post boxes in the area to mark local events or connections. Royal Mail were reported to have said "We first began to see these toppers in 2012 over the festive season, although this soon spread to other key times of the year such as Easter. More recently, we have noticed decorations celebrating various frontline workers during the pandemic, including postal workers."

On Christmas Day 2022, a knitted post box topper created by a woman using the pseudonym Syston Knitting Banxy appeared on an edition of Coronation Street.

References

External links 

Postal infrastructure
Street furniture
2012 establishments in the United Kingdom
Visual arts genres
Folk art
Graffiti and unauthorised signage
Knitting
Crochet
Yarn
Arts in the United Kingdom